Virginia's Husband is a 1928 British silent comedy film directed by Harry Hughes and starring Mabel Poulton, Lilian Oldland and Patrick Aherne. It was based on the play Virginia's Husband by Florence Kilpatrick, and was remade as a sound film in 1934.

Premise
A woman enlists a man to pose as her husband to trick her aunt.

Cast
 Mabel Poulton - Joyce 
 Lilian Oldland - Virginia Trevor 
 Patrick Aherne - Bill Hemingway 
 Marie Ault - Aunt Janet 
 Fewlass Llewellyn - Uncle Donald 
 Ena Grossmith - Elizabeth 
 Charles Dormer - Freddy Parkinson

References

External links
 

1928 films
1928 comedy films
British silent feature films
British comedy films
Films directed by Harry Hughes
British films based on plays
Films shot at Nettlefold Studios
British black-and-white films
1920s English-language films
1920s British films
Silent comedy films